Park Hyunjoon (born September 14, 1987, in Seoul, South Korea) is a South Korean lacrosse player who plays for the Korea National Lacrosse Team as a midfielder and captained South Korea's U-19 and Men's National Lacrosse Teams.

Park has also coached Korea's U-19 National Lacrosse Team and is serving as the delegate of South Korea to World Lacrosse, formerly known as the Federation of International Lacrosse.

International career
Park began his international lacrosse career in 2008 at the U-19 World Championship as an Attackman and as the captain of the U-19 Korea National Lacrosse Team. In 2014, he captained the Men's Korea National Team at the 2014 World Lacrosse Championship in Denver, USA and in the following international competitions until the year 2017. In 2019, Team Korea earned the Bronze Medal at the APLU Asia Pacific Lacrosse Championship in Gyeongju, South Korea behind Japan and Australia.

International competitions
2008 Men's U-19 World Lacrosse Championship Coquitlam, Canada
2009 Asia Pacific Lacrosse Championship Suwon, Korea
2014 World Lacrosse Championship Denver, USA
2015 Asia-Pacific Lacrosse Championship Bangkok, Thailand
2017 Asia-Pacific Lacrosse Championship Jeju, South Korea
2018 World Lacrosse Championship Netanya, Israel 
2019 Asia Pacific Lacrosse Championship Gyeongju, South Korea

Coaching career
In 2016, Park led the South Korea national under-19 national lacrosse team at the World Lacrosse U-19 World Lacrosse Championship in Coquitlam, Canada as an assistant coach and was awarded the 2016 World Lacrosse Spirit of Lacrosse Award.

References
 
 
 
 
 
 
 
 
 
 
 
 
 
 

Lacrosse players
1987 births
Living people